Frédéric Sanchez (born 23 September 1966) is a French sound artist and music producer, best known for his career in the fashion industry. His works include sound collages, mixes, original compositions, and sound installations. Major industry observers such as Vogue, Dazed, AnOther, or Business of Fashion have repeatedly referred to him as "one of the most respected sound designers working today".

In 2005 he was appointed Knight of the Order of Arts and Letters by the French ministry of Culture.

Career overview

Fashion 

Frédéric Sanchez's career began in 1988, when fashion designer Martin Margiela invited him to design the soundtrack for his debut show, and he since worked with various designers and brands such as Prada, Comme des Garçons, Marc Jacobs, Calvin Klein, Hermès, Jil Sander, Jean Paul Gaultier, Givenchy, Louis Vuitton, Martine Sitbon or Helmut Lang. He is a long-term collaborator to the Festival international de mode et de photographie in Hyères, France. Since its creation in 2013 he has been included in Business of Fashion's annual index of the 500 key people shaping the fashion industry.

Art and collaborations 

Sanchez has designed and curated several installations and pieces, which have been displayed or performed in museums and institutions such as the Musée du quai Branly, the Musée du Louvre, the Mudam, the Grand Palais, the Foire internationale d'art contemporain (FIAC), and the parisian gallery Serge Le Borgne. He has collaborated with visual artists Louise Bourgeois, Jack Pierson, Bettina Rheims, Susanna Fritscher, and Orlan ; film directors Larry Clark and Ange Leccia, architects Herzog & de Meuron, and Odile Decq. In 2008, he curated the Gainsbourg 2008 exhibition at Paris’ Cité de la Musique. In 2010, he directed his first art film, Le Soldat Sans Visage.

Music and film 

Frédéric Sanchez supervised the music on three feature films, 2000 Deauville American Film Festival's Prix Michel d'Ornano winner Le Secret directed by Virginie Wagon, 2001 Berlin Film Festival's Golden Bear winner Intimacy directed by Patrice Chéreau, and 2008 Filmfest München's German Cinema Award for Peace winner Die Frau des Anarchisten directed by Peter Sehr and Marie Noëlle. In 2001, he released a music compilation featuring artists such as Mirwais, Fischerspooner, Chilly Gonzales, Peaches and Chicks On Speed.

Selected works

Installations 

 La Salamandre (2004) - Sound installation - Contrepoint exhibit - Musée du Louvre, Paris
 Ondes visibles (2004) - Sound installation - Nave reopening - Grand Palais, Paris
 Console (2004) - Sound performance - FIAC - Grand Palais, Paris
 Castles In The Air (2007) - Sound installation - Galerie Serge Le Borgne, Paris
 Gainsbourg 2008 (2008) - Curator - Cité de la Musique, Paris
 une utile illusion (2008) - Sound installation - Galerie Serge Le Borgne, Paris

Artistic Collaborations 

 Epiderm (1999), Larry Clark - Soundtrack - Galerie Kamel Mennour, Paris
 La Vie (2000),  Jack Pierson - Sound creation - Galerie Thaddaeus Ropac, Paris
 Less aesthetics more ethics (2000), Odile Decq - Sound creation - Venice Biennale of Architecture, Venice
 Soundshowers (2000), Herzog & de Meuron - Sound creation - Prada Building, Tokyo
 C'est Le Murmure De L'Eau Qui Chante (2003), Louise Bourgeois - Remix - Les Films du Siamois
 La déraison du Louvre (2006), Ange Leccia, starring Laetitia Casta - Original soundtrack - Camera Lucida Productions
 Il y'a ce que je sais (2011), Susanna Fritscher - Sound installation - l'Art dans les Chapelles Festival, Pontivy
 Gender Studies (2011), Bettina Rheims - NRW Forum, Düsseldorf
 une autre pièce : blanc (2012), Susanna Fritscher - Galerie Elisabeth & Klaus Thoman, Wienna
 Art or Sound exhibition (2014), curated by Germano Celant - Musical arrangement - Fondazione Prada, Palazzo Grassi, Venice

References 

French electronic musicians
Living people
Sound designers
1966 births
Chevaliers of the Ordre des Arts et des Lettres
French people of Spanish descent
French artists